Westminster Presbyterian Church of Alexandria, Virginia, U.S. located at the corner of Cameron Mills Road and Monticello Boulevard in the city's North Ridge section.  Westminster Presbyterian Church is a member of the Presbyterian Church (U.S.A.), the Mid-Atlantic Synod and the National Capital Presbytery.

History
The congregation was founded in 1939.  Its initial colonial-style edifice was built in 1942.
The current sanctuary was constructed in 1952 to accommodate the rapidly growing congregation; the old sanctuary became the chapel.  The cornerstone of the new building was laid by then President Harry S. Truman.

In 1961, a large education building was added to accommodate Sunday school classes, music facilities, additional office spaces, and meeting areas for numerous church programs.  The church's current organ is a three-manual M. P. Moller, installed by the firm in 1965; the dedicatory recital was played by Virgil Fox, the prominent American concert organist.

In 2006–07, the church underwent major renovations, during which the sanctuary was again rebuilt to accommodate the changing liturgical needs.

During the renovations on the church, Agudas Achim Congregation served as the temporary home of the church.

Senior Pastors at Westminster Presbyterian Church
 The Rev. Dr. Larry Hayward (from 2004 to present)
 The Rev. Dr. Stuart Broberg (from 1998 to 2003)
 The Rev. Dr. George Pera (from 1980 to 1995)
 The Rev. Donald A. Campbell (from 1971 to 1979)
 The Rev. Cliff Johnson (from 1943 to 1970)
 The Rev. Frederick W. Haverkamp (from 1939 to 1943)

Worship
The order of service follows the structure of The Service for the Lord's Day as outlined in The Book of Common Worship of 1993, a directory of worship that has restored a liturgical tradition that is both Reformed and catholic (pre-denominational).  While the centrality of Scripture is upheld through the Word read and proclaimed, the church recognizes that the true unity begins with the sacraments of Baptism and Communion.  The Eucharist is recognized as central to the liturgy, which at Westminster Presbyterian Church is exemplified by the central position of the communion table.  The unity of the communion table, the baptismal font, and the pulpit signify "the true road to healing the brokenness of Christ's church."

Music ministry
The music ministry at Westminster Presbyterian Church is firmly based in the traditions of classical music.  Its music ministry offers the members opportunities to lead worship services as choristers, handbell players, vocal and instrumental soloists, and cantors.

The choir sings a great variety of music in worship, from Renaissance Motets to complex and difficult works such as Bach's St John Passion, Magnificat, several church Cantatas, Rachmaninoff's Liturgy of St. John Chrysostom, Ralph Vaughan Williams' "Dona nobis pacem," or Sergei Taneyev's "St. John of Damascus."  Choral emphasis is on a cappella music.
In 2009-2011, Westminster also offered Bach Vespers at Westminster, a series of evening worship services, unique not only in Alexandria, VA but also in the entire region.  In the two-year cycle of these vesper services, former Westminster Director of Music Ministries Paul Stetsenko performed the complete organ works of J. S. Bach.

References

External links
 Westminster Presbyterian Church, Alexandria, Virginia

Churches in Alexandria, Virginia
Presbyterian churches in Virginia
Christian organizations established in 1932